Matadana (meaning: voting) is a 1965 novel written by the famous Kannada writer, philosopher, thinker S L Bhyrappa. An award winning Kannada movie Mathadana based on this novel, which was directed by T N Seetharam secured 'Best Regional Film' award at 47th National Film Awards. Matadana reveals the caste based politics and other dynamics that grip the democratic institution of ballot box in India.

Synopsis as mentioned on the cover page of the book
A young man, Shivappa, after completing M.B.B.S wants to serve people of his village. He is attracted by the democratic election mechanism believing that he can serve people better. As the Doctor becomes busy with political campaign a person dies because of lack of treatment. Doctor loses in the election and also the incumbent minister loses against a regional leader N S Sadaravalli's son Prakasha Kumara. A small contractor who had helped  the minister by providing financial support commits suicide following the loss in election.

Plot
The novel starts in a village Rangapura near Tumkur in Karnataka. It uses the Tumkur dialect of Kannada language. It is about Doctor Shivappa, medical graduate from Mysore Medical College, who is keen to help society and his village people. Shivappa gains immense popularity among the people across the villages. The story revolves around the politically influential people who uses Shivappa in the upcoming election for their benefit.

Characters

 Dr.Shivappa
 RangaLakshmi (Shivappa's Love interest)
 Ramalingappa Gowdru
 S R Saadaravalli
 Minister Naagaravalli/ Appaji
 Prakasha Kumara Saadaravalli
 Putta Tammaiah
 Kallamma (Shivappa's Mother)
 Puttakka (Shivappa's elder sister)
 Sannaiah (Shivappa's brother-in-law)

Dialogues

 "ಈ ನನ್ಮಕ್ಳಿಗೆ ಆಡಿದ್ ಮಾತೈತಾ? ಕೊಟ್ಟ ನಂಬಿಕೆಯೈತಾ ? ರಂಗಪ್ಪನ ಪಾದದಾಗೆ ನಿಂತು ಆಡಿದ ಮಾತಿಗೆ ಈಗ ಹಿಂದ್ಲೇಟು ಒಡೆಯೋ ಸೂಳೆಮಕ್ಳಿಗೆ ಒಳ್ಳೆದಾಗ್ತೈತ ?"
 "ನೋಡು ನಮ್ಮುನ್ನ ಇಂದುಗಡೆ ಆಡಿಕೊಳ್ಲೋರ್ಗೆ ಪ್ರಕಾಶನ ಮದ್ವೆ ಹಿಂಗಾದ್ದುಕ್ಕೆ ಒಂದು ಮಾತು ಸಿಕ್ಕಿದ ಹಂಗೆ ಆಗೈತೆ. ಇನ್ನ ಈ ಡಾಕ್ಟ್ರದ್ದೂ ಆಗ್ದೆ ಇದ್ರೆ ನಮ್ಮ ಮರ್ಯಾದೆ ಒಗ್ಬಿಡ್ತೈತೆ. ಅವನ್ನ ಕರ್ಕಂಡೆ ಬರಬೇಕು"

Reprints
Since its first printing in 1965, the book has had many reprints:

First printing: 1965
Second printing: 1969
Third printing: 1975
Fourth printing: 1982
Fifth printing: 1987
Sixth printing: 1987
Seventh printing: 1998
Eighth printing: 2002
Ninth printing: 2007
Tenth printing: 2010

Kannada novelists 
 U R Ananthamurthy

Notes

References
 Special Correspondent. "Bureaucrats cannot act in films." The Hindu. Accessed November 2011.
 Book available in USA at Sahitya Bhandara of North America 
 Authors official website : 
 Author's webpage: slbhyrappa.com
 Book: Matadana by S L Bhyrappa, Publisher: Sahitya Bhandara, Balepete, Bangalore.
 http://kannada.oneindia.in/movies/controversy/2001/06/matadan1.html#top
 http://www.kamat.com/kalranga/kar/writers/s_l_bhyrappa.htm
 A brief note on Matadana available at: 
 Reference of the book Matadana mentioned in " Politics and the novel in India, Volumes 6-9 By Yogendra K. Malik, Carl Lieberman" p. 138 line 4 

Kannada novels
1965 Indian novels
Indian novels adapted into films
Novels by S. L. Bhyrappa